The 5th constituency of Moselle is a French legislative constituency in the Moselle département.

Description

The 5th Constituency of Moselle occupies a finger of territory jutting eastwards from the main body of the Department, bordered to the north by Germany and to the south by Bas-Rhin. Almost entirely rural the constituency includes a large part of the Northern Vosges Regional Natural Park.

Until 2017, the seat elected conservatives throughout the Fifth Republic save for between 1997 and 2002 when Socialist Gilbert Maurer captured it.

Historic Representation

Election results

2022

2017

2012

 
 
 
 
 
|-
| colspan="8" bgcolor="#E9E9E9"|
|-

Sources
Official results of French elections from 2002: "Résultats électoraux officiels en France" (in French).

5